The Tamil Nadu football team is an Indian football team representing Tamil Nadu in Indian state football competitions including the Santosh Trophy. They have appeared in the Santosh Trophy finals twice, in 1972–73 and 2012, and have never won. Tamil Nadu team reached semi-finals of the Santosh Trophy in 2009, where they lost to Goa. Prior to 1972, the team competed as Madras football team.

Squad
The team selected for 2021
Santosh Trophy;

Coaching staff

Player history
Some of the former Tamil Nadu state football players are Samson Gunapandian, Simon Sundararaj, J. Krishnaswamy, Raman Vijayan, Syed Sabir Pasha, Kalia Kulothungan, Robin Charles Raja, V. Soundararajan, P.M. Radhakrishnan, P. Nageshwara Rao, M. Thangaraj, Gandhi (RBI), Edwin Ross (Winger), D'Cruz (ICF), Orlando Rayen, A.U. Celestine (Goal Keeper), P.V. Sriramulu, A. Satyanarayanan, Guna Singh, Koshy, Kumar, Thomas, Arumaiyanayagam, Thanikachalam, Chandran Jeypal, Dhanapathy, Gurunathan, Viswanathan, and Rajamanickam (Goal Keeper).

Simon Sundararaj from Thanjavur, Tamil Nadu scored the last Indian goal at the Olympics, in Rome in 1960.

Most of these former players were employees of State or Central government institutions. All India Football Federation and Tamil Nadu Football Association were coordinating these players participation at the National level. In the past, to attend preparatory camps to get selected for the India national football team, it was difficult for these players to obtain leave from the institutions in which they were employed. Some Tamil Nadu football players use their football talent and achievements to get jobs in Government institutions like Southern Railways, Indian Bank, and Chennai Customs.

The following is an incomplete list of Tamil Nadu footballers.

 Dhanpal Ganesh
 Dharmaraj Ravanan
 Nallappan Mohanraj
 Kali Alaudeen
 C. S. Sabeeth
 Pradeep Mohanraj
 Michael Soosairaj
 Edwin Sydney Vanspaul
 Nanda Kumar
 Raegan Albarnas
 P. Sudhakar
 Michael Regin
 Sinivasan Pandiyan
 Alexander Romario Jesuraj

Honours
 Santosh Trophy
 Runners-up (2): 1972–73, 2011–12

National Games
 Silver medal (1): 2007
 Bronze medal (1): 2002

 Mir Iqbal Hussain Trophy
 Winners (1): 1985–86
 Runners-up (1): 1999–2000

 M. Dutta Ray Trophy
 Runners-up (2): 2004, 2007

References

Football in Tamil Nadu
Santosh Trophy teams